Sava Janjić (born 6 December 1965), born as Dragutin Janjić (Драгутин Јањић) is a Serbian Orthodox archimandrite and a hegumen of the Visoki Dečani monastery.

Biography 
He was born in 1965 in Dubrovnik. He comes from a mixed marriage of Serb father and Croat mother. As a child, he moved with his family to Trebinje, where he spent the period of schooling and youth, and finished middle and high school. He studied English language at the University of Belgrade.He came to the Crna Reka monastery in 1989. He spent several years there. Together with the rest of the fraternity, he moved to the Visoki Dečani monastery, with the desire to restore the spiritual reputation of this endowment of King Stefan Dečanski. He has been dealing with information technologies since 1994. He managed to bring the Church closer to the new technologies. Thanks to him, during the entire NATO bombing of Yugoslavia and the Kosovo War, the world had information that could not be found anywhere else.

He was ordained to the rank of hierodeacon on June 4, 1992, and on January 8, 1993, to the rank of hieromonk.

After that, he was the secretary of the Bishop of Raška and Prizren, Artemije (Radosavljević). Together with him and Momčilo Trajković, he traveled the world during 1998 and 1999, trying to explain the truth about the situation in Kosovo and Metohija to world statesmen. He was a member of the Serbian National Council of Kosovo and Metohija. In 2011, at the suggestion of the Bishop of Raška and Prizren, Teodosije (Šibalić), he was elected hegumen of the monastery Visoki Dečani.

References

See also 

 Sava Janjić's Official Twitter Account
 Sava Janjić's Official Facebook Account

1965 births
Living people
People from Dubrovnik
Serbs of Croatia
Serbian people of Croatian descent
Serbian Orthodox clergy
University of Belgrade alumni
People from Trebinje
Kosovo Serbs